Wicknell Chivayo Is a Zimbabwean businessman who rose to prominence after winning large Zimbabwean government contracts. It was reported that the then Energy and Power Development Minister of Zimbabwe Samuel Undenge pressured the Zimbabwe Power Company (ZPC) to pay Chivayo's company called Intratek Zimbabwe $5 million despite the absence of a bank guarantee.

Background and career 
In January 2018, Zimbabwe's Energy and Power Development Minister Simon Khaya-Moyo said the contract between the Zimbabwe Electricity Supply Authority's subsidiary ZPC and Chivayo was discussed in Cabinet (government) and his predecessor, Minister Samuel Undenge, failed to give a convincing explanation on why ZPC proceeded to pay Chivayo when no progress had been made on the project site. On 22 January 2018 it was reported that ZPC actually paid Chivayo's company Intratek $7 million instead of the $5 million advance payment that was initially reported.  Chivayo single handedly sponsored the Zimbabwe national football team but later withdrew that sponsorship. Chivayo was part of an audience that attended a meeting in South Africa held by current Zimbabwean president Emmerson Mnangagwa.

President Emmerson Mnangagwa went to South Africa in December 2017, to address potential Zimbabwean investors based in that nation.
Zimbabwean President Emmerson Mnangagwa had plans to investigate Wicknell Chivayo over $1 billion worth of tender business from the Zimbabwean government. According to the Zimbabwean government's state broadcaster ZBC Chivayo was placed under oath by the Zimbabwean parliament and asked to explain how he used the money allocated to his company, Intratrek. It was also reported that Chivayo then disowned Intratrek while the company's CEO Yousouf Ahmed through his lawyer claimed he was not aware of how Chivayo had spent the money and distanced himself from the charge.

Controversy 

In 2017 the Zimbabwe Electricity Supply Authority (ZESA) and the Zimbabwean Parliament probed Chivayo's electricity power contracts that included a USD$200 million dollar power contract for Gwanda, a small town in Zimbabwe and other power contracts that had an accumulated value in excess of USD$600 million of which none were ever delivered. In late January 2018, general secretary of the Energy Sector Workers' Union of Zimbabwe (ESWUZ), Gibson Mushunje, claimed that Chivayo was involved in power contracts reaching up to USD$684 million. In March 2018, Chivayo drew attention for buying shoes worth R20 000 South African rand and compared himself to Adolf Hitler for having so many shoes

Arrests 
In 2004 Chivayo was charged with fraud involving ZAR 837 000 South African rand while other's believed the amount to exceed R2 000 000 South African rand and was incarcerated at Chikurubi Prison, a maximum security prison in Zimbabwe. In December 2017 Chivayo was arrested over a $5 million United States dollar ZESA contract.

Zimbabwean politics
Chivayo questioned Nelson Chamisa’s claim at a Movement for Democratic Change – Tsvangirai rally that Zimbabwe will have bullet trains. Grace Mugabe, Zimbabwe's former first lady is believed to be associated with Chivayo. Energy Sector Workers Union of Zimbabwe accused the Zimbabwe Electricity Transmission and Distribution Company (ZETDC) of providing funds to Chivayo and Grace Mugabe. Chivayo apologised to former higher education minister Jonathan Moyo and offered to donate education material worth $50 000 to a Tsholotsho District school of his choice, a development that was likely viewed as support to the Generation 40 (G40) faction of ZANU–PF.

Personal life 
In 2017 Chivayo married Sonja Madzikanda and it was reported that a bride price of USD$50 000 was paid. Popular international artist Oliver Mtukudzi serenaded guests at Chivayo's wedding. In 2018 Chivayo made news for publishing his son's (John Chenjera-Chivayo) DNA test results to prove that the child was his son.

References 

living people
1982 births
Zimbabwean businesspeople